Walter Armitage (June 1, 1906 – February 22, 1953, born in Johannesburg, South Africa) was a South African playwright, stage and film actor.

Selected filmography
 Potiphar's Wife (1931)
 A Honeymoon Adventure (1931)
 The Love Habit (1931)
 Bombay Mail (1934)
 The Dover Road (1934)
 Great Expectations (1934)

References

External links

1906 births
1953 deaths
South African male film actors
South African male stage actors
20th-century South African male actors
South African dramatists and playwrights
20th-century dramatists and playwrights
20th-century South African writers